Firmani is a surname. Notable people with the surname include:

 Eddie Firmani (born 1933), Italian football player and manager
 Fabio Firmani (born 1978), Italian football player

See also 
 Firman (surname)